Svatopluk Skýva was a Czech fencer. He competed in the individual and team sabre events at the 1948 Summer Olympics.

References

External links
  

Year of birth missing
Possibly living people
Czech male fencers
Czechoslovak male fencers
Olympic fencers of Czechoslovakia
Fencers at the 1948 Summer Olympics